Copris is a genus of dung beetles in the tribe Coprini (subfamily Scarabaeinae) of the scarab family. It comprises more than 250 tunnelling species and has an almost worldwide distribution.

Species

Gallery

References

External links

Copris in Insectoid.Info has a list of species.
A recent review of the Copris fidius group - Deschodt, C.M., Davis, A.L. and Scholtz, C.H., 2015. A new synonymy in the fidius group of Copris Müller 1764 (Coleoptera: Scarabaeidae: Scarabaeinae) and a new species from the highland grasslands of South Africa. Zootaxa, 3949(3), p. 431.

Coprini
Scarabaeidae genera